İpekyolu  is a district and town in Van Province, Turkey.

History 
According to the 2012 Metropolitan Municipalities Law (law no. 6360), all Turkish provinces with a population more than 750 000, will be a metropolitan municipality and the districts within the metropolitan municipalities  will be second level municipalities. The law also creates new districts within the provinces in addition to present districts. These changes became valid by the local elections in 2014.

Thus after 2014 the Van central district was split into two. A part was named İpekyolu and the name Van will be reserved for the metropolitan municipality. İpekyolu means Silk road, Van was an important stop on the silk road.

Rural area
There were two towns and 30 villages in the rural area of İpekyolu. Now their official status became "neighborhood of İpekyolu".

Politics 
On 30 March 2014, Aygül Bidav from the  Peace and Democracy Party (BDP) was elected the first mayor of İpekyolu. But a trustee was appointed on the 11 September 2016. In the local elections in March 2019 Azim Yacan from the Peoples Democratic Party (HDP) became Mayor. Following Şehzade Kurt was elected Co-Mayor of İpekyolu. In November 2019, Yacan and Kurt were arrested accused of being a member of a terrorist organization and a trustee was appointed. The current District Governor is Sinan Aslan.

References

Districts of Van Province
Silk Road
Kurdish settlements in Turkey